Komo is a sector in Tombali Region, Guinea-Bissau.

According to the 2009 census, its population was 8,777.

In 1973, Komo was an early site of fighting during the Guinea-Bissau War of Independence.

References

Tombali Region
Sectors of Guinea-Bissau
Populated places in Guinea-Bissau